The Idaho State Bar (ISB) is the integrated (mandatory) bar association of the U.S. state of Idaho. It is a self-governing state agency of the State of Idaho.

History 
Portions of the Idaho Code pertaining to the practice of law in Idaho date back to 1881. The present "integrated" Bar was established by the Idaho Legislature in 1923.

Structure

The ISB operates under authority delegated by the Idaho Supreme Court through its rule making power, particularly in the area of admissions and discipline. The rules that govern the process are known as the "Idaho Bar Commission Rules."

The ISB is governed by five commissioners, elected from the seven districts into which the state is divided. Commissioners serve for staggered three years terms. The current executive director of the ISB is Diane Minnich.

Committees 
 Bar Exam Preparation
 Character & Fitness
 Client Assistance Fund
 Lawyer Referral Service
 The Advocate Editorial Advisory Board
 Unauthorized Practice of Law
 Reasonable Accommodations
 Professional Conduct Board
 Lawyers Assistance Program
 Idaho Academy of Leadership for Lawyers

References

American state bar associations
Government of Idaho
1923 establishments in Idaho
Organizations established in 1923